Luis Miguel Salvador López (born 26 February 1968) is a Mexican former professional footballer who played as a forward.

Career
Salvador was on Mexico national team at the 1994 FIFA World Cup, playing only 10 minutes during the Republic of Ireland match.

Salvador is the third scorer in Atlante history, just below "Cabinho" and Horacio Casarin. He used the number 9 in his jersey, he changed it to 68 when Hugo Sánchez came to Atlante F.C.

Salvador was champion of the Mexico league in the 1992–1993 season. In that squad he played with noteworthy players as Daniel Guzmán, Miguel Herrera, Raúl Gutiérrez, and Roberto Andrade. The coach was Ricardo Lavolpe. In this season, Salvador finished second in the top scorers list, just below Ivo Basay.

During his stay with Celaya, Salvador's goal celebration antics were unique. He pretended to be meditating, playing golf, fishing, and other unusual behaviors.

Career statistics

International goals

Honours
Atlante
Mexican Primera División: 1992–93

Mexico
CONCACAF Gold Cup: 1993

External links

1968 births
Living people
1994 FIFA World Cup players
CONCACAF Gold Cup-winning players
Association football forwards
Footballers from Mexico City
Mexico international footballers
Atlante F.C. footballers
C.F. Monterrey players
Atlético Celaya footballers
Mexican footballers
1993 CONCACAF Gold Cup players